Brücke zwischen gestern und morgen (English: Bridge Between Yesterday and Tomorrow) is an East German television film directed by Fred Mahr. It was released in 1959.

Cast
 Antje Ruge as Frau Wermann
 Rudolf Ulrich as Hans Gutweil
 Ellinor Vogel as Herta Gutweil
 Hans Knötzsch as Flüchting
 Peter A. Stiege as Willi Rückert

External links
 

1959 films
East German films
1950s German-language films
German black-and-white films
1950s German films